Saurita anselma is a moth in the subfamily Arctiinae. It was described by Schaus in 1924. It is found in Panama.

References

Natural History Museum Lepidoptera generic names catalog

Moths described in 1924
Saurita
Arctiinae of South America